Ritvars is a Latvian masculine given name and may refer to:

Ritvars Gulbis (born 1980), Latvian curler and curling coach
Ritvars Rugins (born 1989), Latvian footballer
Ritvars Suharevs (born 1999), Latvian weightlifter

References

Latvian masculine given names